V2052 Ophiuchi, also known as HR 6684, is a star about 920 light years from Earth in the constellation Ophiuchus. It is a 5th-magnitude star, making it faintly visible to the naked eye of an observer far from city lights. V2052 Ophiuchi is a Beta Cephei variable (β Cep) star, varying slightly in brightness from magnitude 5.81 to 5.84 over a period of about 3.4 hours.

In 1972, Mikolaj Jerzykiewicz announced that HR 6684 is a variable star, based on his observations using the 0.6 meter Air Force Telescope on Mauna Kea. He classified the star as a β Cep variable with period of 0.13989 days, He further noted that if confirmed, it would be the least luminous and shortest period β Cep star known up to that date. Spectroscopic and photometric observations by D. Harold McNamara and Bruce Bills in 1973 confirmed Jerzykiewicz's results. In 1973, HR 6684 was given the variable star designation V2052 Ophiuchi.

In 1994, Henryk Cugier et al. determined that V2052 Ophiuchi pulsated primarily in the fundamental (l=0) radial mode. A much less powerful non-radial pulsation mode was identified in 2003. Observations at the Pic du Midi Observatory showed that V2052 Ophiuchi has a dipole magnetic field, the axis of which is offset from the star's center, and there are helium spots on the surface near the magnetic poles. V2052 Ophiuchi is a type of chemically peculiar star known as a helium-strong star. Its surface is over-abundant in helium, and under-abundant in oxygen, perhaps due to its magnetic field differentially effecting the diffusion of elements in its atmosphere.

References

Ophiuchus (constellation)
87812
163472
Ophiuchi, V2052
6684
Beta Cephei variables
Chemically peculiar stars